The A 22 road is an A-Grade trunk road in Sri Lanka. It connects Passara with Monaragala.

The A 22 passes through Badalkumbura to reach Monaragala.

References

Highways in Sri Lanka